Duke Gui of Qi (reigned c. 10th century BC) was the fourth recorded ruler of the ancient Chinese state of Qi during the Western Zhou Dynasty.  His personal name was Lü Cimu (呂慈母) and ancestral name was Jiang (姜).

Duke Gui succeeded his father Duke Yǐ of Qi, and was succeeded by his son Duke Ai of Qi.  Two of his younger sons also later ascended the throne as Duke Hu of Qi and Duke Xian of Qi, respectively.

Family
Concubines:
 The mother of Princes Buchen and Shan

Sons:
 Prince Buchen (d. 890 BC), ruled as Duke Ai of Qi from 901–890 BC
 Prince Jing (d. 859 BC), ruled as Duke Hu of Qi from 889–859 BC
 Prince Shan (d. 850 BC), ruled as Duke Xian of Qi from 858–850 BC

Ancestry

References

Monarchs of Qi (state)
10th-century BC Chinese monarchs